Hofmeyr is a surname. Notable people with the surname include:

Gray Hofmeyr (born 1949), South African film and television director
Hendrik Hofmeyr (born 1957), South African composer
Jan Hofmeyr (disambiguation), multiple people
Murray Hofmeyr (born 1925), South African rugby union player and cricketer
Steve Hofmeyr (born 1964), South African singer, songwriter and actor